Burgheard is an Anglo-Saxon male name. It may refer to:

 Burgheard (fl. 869), bishop of Lindsey (or perhaps Lichfield)
 Burgheard, son of Ælfgar (died 1061), son of Ælfgar, Earl of Mercia

See also
 Burchard (disambiguation)
 Bouchard

Old English given names